The Brand New Heavies is an acid jazz and funk group formed in 1985 in Ealing in west London. Centered around songwriters/multi-instrumentalists Simon Bartholomew and Andrew Levy, the core members of the group since its founding, Brand New Heavies are best known for a string of successful singles in the early 1990s featuring N'Dea Davenport as lead vocalist.

Biography

1980s–1990s 
The Brand New Heavies began in the 1980s as an instrumental acid jazz group called Brothers International.

The group came up with the Heavies name after signing their first record contract, borrowing from a liner note on a James Brown single declaring the artist "Minister of New Super Heavy Funk". As The Brand New Heavies they gained a cult following in the London club scene and soon signed to Cooltempo as acid jazz replaced rare groove in clubs. The band issued a debut recording for Eddie Piller's Acid Jazz label in 1990 with Jay Ella Ruth as lead singer.

A single, "Got to Give", came out on Cooltempo before the Brand New Heavies signed to Acid Jazz Records and released Brand New Heavies to critical acclaim. The band signed to a division of Chrysalis Records in the UK, and American distribution was picked up by influential label Delicious Vinyl, and N'Dea Davenport (who had signed an artist development deal with Delicious Vinyl) joined the group. A revamped version of the first album with vocals by N'Dea Davenport was then released, and the singles "Dream Come True", "Never Stop" and "Stay This Way", all with Davenport on lead vocals, became hits on both sides of the Atlantic, with the latter becoming a music video directed by Douglas Gayeton that saw heavy rotation on MTV.

The group's appearance with MC Serch (formerly of 3rd Bass) and Q-Tip (of A Tribe Called Quest) at a performance in New York City, inspired the group to incorporate elements of hip hop music. Their next album was the critically acclaimed Heavy Rhyme Experience, Vol. 1, which included collaborations with Guru of Gang Starr and The Pharcyde, among others, but lacked any female vocals.

The Brand New Heavies released Brother Sister in 1994 which was the last album for a while with N'Dea Davenport, who had left to complete her solo album (which she had put on hold to join the Heavies). The album spawned more singles, though one of them, a cover of Maria Muldaur's "Midnight at the Oasis", was popular only in the UK because it was not included in the US version of the album.

Siedah Garrett joined the group for their next album, Shelter (1997). It contained the minor hit, the Carole King-penned song "You've Got a Friend" that was originally made famous by James Taylor. Again, though, this song did not appear on the US version of the album. The album also contained the hit "Sometimes". The remix of "Sometimes" included the rap vocals of Q-Tip.

2000s–present 
The Brand New Heavies then released their greatest hits album, Trunk Funk – The Best of The Brand New Heavies (2000) with Carleen Anderson on vocals for some newly recorded songs, followed by the Japan only album We Won't Stop (2003) featuring a variety of vocalists and Allaboutthefunk (2005) co-written and co-produced by Nicole Russo (as detailed on the album sleeve) who also featured as Lead vocalist.

For We Won't Stop album, The Brand New Heavies relied on singer/songwriter Sy Smith for the bulk of the female vocals. Original member Jan Kincaid takes the lead on three of the tracks, and Los Angeles-based poet Gina Loring makes several appearances on the album. Where the Heavies typical sound had typically been more 1970s funk-styled and acoustically driven, We Won't Stop sees the band experimenting with more electronic elements and contemporary R&B.

The album marked the first commercial release of "What Do You Take Me For", the band's lone track featuring former flagship lead vocalist N'Dea Davenport. The track would be later re-recorded in a more modern configuration with Nicole Russo on lead for the Allabouthefunk album. The sound and musical arrangement heard on these first releases of "Music", "Love Is...", and the title track "We Won't Stop" were re-recorded with new leads on N'Dea Davenport's 2006 return to the band for the comeback album Get Used to It.

In April 2006, the Brand New Heavies reunited with N'Dea Davenport and former label Delicious Vinyl. A new album, Get Used to It was released on 27 June 2006 via Starbucks and more traditional music retail outlets.  The album was recorded in New York and London; and the lead single "I Don't Know Why (I Love You)" was issued in early May. The single was notable for being one of very few late releases to feature the trademarked A Tom Moulton Mix, as he had been asked to contribute remixes. Later that year, their Heavy Rhyme Experience, Vol. 1 album track "Jump 'n' Move" featuring Jamal-ski was featured on the soundtrack for the 2006 computer animated feature film Happy Feet and the in-game soundtrack for 2004's NBA Live 2005 and 2009's NBA 2k10. The band toured at the end of 2006.

The Heavies recorded a cover of "C'est Magnifique" (originally from Cole Porter's 1953 musical Can-Can) for an early 2009 TV ad by Lancôme. The song also appeared in an early track listing of the Heavies' 2009 live album, but wasn't eventually included. The 2-CD Live in London was released in October 2009. The studio version of "C'est Magnifique" was released as a download and also included on a couple of various artists compilations.

The Brand New Heavies released a download instrumental album called Dunk Your Trunk in November 2011. The album, recorded in only four days and described as 'funky library music' is directed at 'TV and Movie people to add to their programmes and films'. The 5-track Dunk Your Trunk Remixed E.P. was released on download on 1 May 2013.

The Brand New Heavies eighth studio album Forward was released on 6 May 2013. Lead vocal duties on the album are divided evenly between N'Dea Davenport, who features on the first single "Sunlight", Jan Kincaid and Simon Bartholomew, making his debut as lead vocalist on this album, and new UK vocalist Dawn Joseph. While the album was produced by the Heavies themselves, as all their previous albums, there are also new collaborators, including songwriters Johan Jones Wetterberg, Marc Jackson Burrows, Rita Campbell and Tim Laws and mixing engineer Toni Economides.

On 10 October 2013, The Brand New Heavies announced via their website that Dawn Joseph had officially joined the band as full-time lead vocalist and that the band were working on a new studio album slated for release in early 2014.

On 21 February 2014, The Brand New Heavies played at Buxton Opera House with support from British acoustic blues singer songwriter Matt Woosey.  The Brand New Heavies ninth studio album Sweet Freaks, with Dawn Joseph on vocals, was released on 24 October 2014.

Jan Kincaid and Dawn Joseph both left The Brand New Heavies in late 2015. In July 2016, the band began touring extensively in Europe and Japan with Sulene Fleming on vocals. She stayed until 2018. In November 2018 the band started touring with Angela Ricci on vocals.

The Brand New Heavies premiered their new single "Getaway" with N'Dea Davenport on vocals in April 2019.  A new studio album, TBNH, was released on 6 September 2019 on Acid Jazz Records and features Davenport, Siedah Garrett, Angie Stone, Beverley Knight, Angela Ricci, Jack Knight, Honey Larochelle, and Laville. The fUnKin in the UK Tour brought the band all across the UK in 2021, after the live shows were rescheduled following the COVID-19 pandemic.

Awards and nominations

Members

Current members
 Angela Ricci – vocals (2018–present)
 Simon Bartholomew – vocals, guitar, producer (1985–present)
 Andrew Levy – bass, keyboards, producer (1985–present)
 Matt Steele – keyboards, piano, synth programming (2013–present)
 Luke Harris – drums (2016–present)
 Hannah McGuigan – background vocals (2014–present)
 Lily Gonzalez – background vocals (2016–present)
 Bryan Corbett – trumpet (2015–present)
 Richard Beesley – saxophone (2015–present)

Former members
 Jan Kincaid – vocals, drums (1985–2015)
 Lascelles Gordon – percussion, keyboards (1985–1992)
 Ceri Evans – keyboards (1985–1992)
 Jay Ella Ruth – lead vocals (1990)
 Rob Cremona – keyboards (1990–1991)
 Jim Wellman – saxophone (1990–1991)
 N'Dea Davenport – lead vocals, tambourine (1990–1995, 2005–2013, 2016, 2019)
 Mike Smith – saxophone (1994–1996)
 Dennis Rollins – trombone (1994–1996)
 John Thirkell – trumpet, flugel (1994–1997)
 Siedah Garrett – lead vocals (1997–1998, 2019)
 Carleen Anderson – lead vocals (1999–2000)
 Sy Smith – lead vocals (2003)
 Nicole Russo – lead vocals (2003–2004)
 Dawn Joseph – lead vocals (2013–2015)
 Sulene Fleming – vocals (2016–2018)
 Ivana Kotov – background vocals (2012–2016)

Discography

The Brand New Heavies (1990)
Heavy Rhyme Experience, Vol. 1 (1992)
Brother Sister (1994)
Shelter (1997)
We Won't Stop (2003)
Allabouthefunk (2004)
Get Used to It (2006)
Dunk Your Trunk (2011)
Forward (2013)
Sweet Freaks (2014)
TBNH (2019)

References

External links

Official Website

Musical groups established in 1985
English dance music groups
Musical groups from the London Borough of Ealing
English jazz ensembles
Acid jazz ensembles
English funk musical groups
Delicious Vinyl artists
Jazz fusion ensembles
FFRR Records artists
1985 establishments in England
Acid Jazz Records artists
Live Here Now artists